Perseverance Mountain is located on the border of Alberta and British Columbia.

See also
 List of peaks on the Alberta–British Columbia border
 Mountains of Alberta
 Mountains of British Columbia

References

Perseverance
Perseverance
Canadian Rockies